Clint Bajakian (born 1962) is an American video game composer and musician.

Biography 
Bajakian was born in Bryn Mawr, Pennsylvania. He was linked with music since age of eight. In middle school, Bajakian played in marching bands, and also played in a range of rock bands from 1977 to 1984. He has studied music at the New England Conservatory, earning degrees of double-Bachelor of Arts in Classic Guitar Performance. Then, Bajakian enrolled in the University of Michigan, earning a Master of Music degree in Music Composition.

After that, he joined LucasArts under invitation of a good friend of Bajakian's and his co-player in rock bands Michael Land. Bajakian worked for LucasArts from 1991 until May 2000. He has worked on several classic LucasArts games, where he gained much of his fame with Michael Land and Peter McConnell, LucasArts' other principal composers. While there, Bajakian received fame for his Ennio Morricone-influenced score for 1997 western shooter Outlaws which received a Special Achievement award from Computer Gaming Magazine. After quitting LucasArts he formed his own sound production company, C.B. Studios. His company changed names to The Sound Department, and finally to Bay Area Sound. Recently, he has ventured into working with other publishers as well as writing the score for a short film, The Upgrade. Bajakian joined Sony Computer Entertainment in 2004 and headed up the music production group in original scoring as Senior Music Manager until 2013. In October 2013 he became VP of Development and Composer at Pyramind Studios, contributing original music to Blizzard Entertainment's World of Warcraft: Warlords of Draenor, among other projects.

Clint Bajakian was the first vice president and co-founder of the Game Audio Network Guild and is a member of Academy of Interactive Arts and Sciences. In 2013, Bajakian received the Lifetime Achievement Award from the Game Audio Network Guild, and in 2012, the Outstanding Alumni Award from The New England Conservatory.

Discography

Video game soundtracks

Film Soundtrack 
 Panzehir (2014)

Filmography

Video games

Other works 
The Upgrade (2000)

References

External links 

Interview at the International House of Mojo
Interview at Mojo hosted site iMuse Island
GameSpy interview

1962 births
Living people
Lucasfilm people
Video game composers
American male composers
21st-century American composers
American people of Armenian descent
University of Michigan School of Music, Theatre & Dance alumni
21st-century American male musicians